The Unwinding Hours were a Scottish alternative rock band formed in 2008 by former Aereogramme members Craig B. and Iain Cook. The band released their self-titled debut album on 15 February 2010 and Afterlives in 2012, as well as several tour/live EPs.

The duo announced their project in August 2009 with the following statement: "We used to play in a band called Aereogramme. That may or may not matter to you. Just thought I'd mention it".

History
Regarding the band's origins, vocalist Craig B. stated that:

In August 2009, the band set up a Myspace account featuring a demo track, "Solstice", and a blog entry which read:

The band made their live debut at Celtic Connections 2010, performing at Chemikal Underground's "15th Anniversary" concert. They played their first headlining show to a sold-out crowd in Stereo, Glasgow, on 5 March, opening with the words "We are The Unwinding Hours. And we're going to start with the end", before playing the closing track from their debut album. For some of their gigs, the base duo of The Unwinding Hours added musicians Graeme Smillie (guitar), Brendan Smith (keyboards) and Jonny Scott (drums).

The band has not been active since 2013, with Iain Cook focusing on Chvrches and Craig B. releasing solo material as A Mote of Dust.

Discography
The Unwinding Hours (2010)
Afterlives (2012)

References

External links
 
 The Unwinding Hours at MySpace

Musical groups established in 2008
Musical groups disestablished in 2013
Scottish indie rock groups
Musical groups from Glasgow
Chemikal Underground artists